Hala Al Turk (born May 15, 2002) is a Jordanian-Syrian Bahraini singer. She become known for being a contestant on Arabs Got Talent in 2011. Al Turk then released many singles, including "Bnayty El Habooba (2011)" featuring singer Mashael, for which she become a popular child singer. "Happy Happy" released in 2013 is the first Arabic music video to cross 100 million views. She subsequently signed to Platinum Records and released other singles. In early 2015, she moved to her father's company, AlTurk Productions.

Biography 
She was born on May 15, 2002 to a Jordanian father and a Syrian mother in Manama, Bahrain. She has two brothers named Mohammed Al Turk and Hamood Al Turk. She started her career through the program, Little Star, in 2009, but came to prominence in 2011 through her participation as a contestant on Arabs Got Talent. However, she was eliminated but went on to establish a successful career as a child singer. She is currently signed to Al Turk Productions.

In 2014, she hosted the entertainment program, Huwa Wa-hay Wahi, during the month of Ramadan alongside Haya Al Shuaibi, Amal Al Awadhi and Bashar Al Shatti.

Discography

References

21st-century Bahraini women singers
2002 births
Living people
Bahraini film actresses
Bahraini television actresses
English-language singers
Bahraini people of Jordanian descent
Bahraini people of Syrian descent